Since the 1980s, member states of the European Union have started to harmonise aspects of the designs of their ordinary passports (but not other types of passports, such as diplomatic, service and emergency passports), as well as common security features and biometrics.

Most passports issued by EU member states have the common recommended layout; burgundy in colour with the words "European Union" accompanied by the name of the issuing member state printed on the cover.

Characteristics

Overall format
 Paper size B7 (ISO/IEC 7810 ID-3, 88 mm × 125 mm)
 32 pages (passports with more pages can be issued to frequent travellers)
 Colour of cover: burgundy red or blue

Cover
Information on the cover, in this order, in the language(s) of the issuing state:
 Name of the issuing state 
 Emblem of the state
 The word "PASSPORT"
 The biometric passport symbol:

First page
Information on the first page, in one or more of the languages:
 Name of the issuing state 
 The word "PASSPORT"
 Serial number (may also be repeated on the other pages)

Identification page
Information on the (possibly laminated) identification page, in the languages of the issuing state plus English and French:
{|
|-
|1. Surname
|2. Forename(s)
|-
|3. Nationality
|4. Date of birth
|-
|5. Sex
|6. Place of birth
|-
|7. Date of issue    
|8. Date of expiry
|-
|9. Authority
|10. Signature of holder
|}

Following page
Optional information on the following page:
{|
|11. Residence
|12. Height
|-
|13. Colour of eyes    
|14. Extension of the passport
|-
|15. Name at birth (if now using married name or have legally changed names)
|}

Remaining pages
 The following page is reserved for:
 Details concerning the spouse of the holder of the passport (where a family passport is issued)
 Details concerning children accompanying the holder (name, first name, date of birth, sex)
 Photographs of the faces of spouse and children
 The following page is reserved for use by the issuing authorities
 The remaining pages are reserved for visa
 The inside back cover is reserved for additional information or recommendations by the issuing state in its own official language(s)

Overview of passports issued by the EU candidate states

Visa requirements for the nationals of EU candidate states for travel to the EEA, United States and Canada
Nationals of the candidate countries have varying visa arrangements with the Schengen Area and the Common Travel Area members, as well as with the United States and Canada. The following table details the requirements:

Current EU enlargement agenda 

The enlargement of the European Union involves the accession of new member states. This process began with the Inner Six, who founded the European Coal and Steel Community (the EU's predecessor) in 1952. Since then, the EU's membership has grown to twenty-seven with the most recent expansion to Croatia in 2013 and the departure of UK in 2020.

Currently, accession negotiations are under way with several states. The process of enlargement is sometimes referred to as European integration. This term is also used to refer to the intensification of co-operation between EU member states as national governments allow for the gradual harmonisation of national laws.

To join the European Union, a state needs to fulfil economic and political conditions called the Copenhagen criteria (after the Copenhagen summit in June 1993), which require a stable democratic government that respects the rule of law, and its corresponding freedoms and institutions. According to the Maastricht Treaty, each current member state and the European Parliament must agree to any enlargement.

The present enlargement agenda of the European Union regards Turkey and the Western Balkans. Turkey has a long-standing application with the EU but the negotiations are expected to take many more years. As for the Western Balkan states, the EU had pledged to include them after their civil wars: in fact, two states have entered, three are candidates, one applied and the others have pre-accession agreements.

There are however other states in Europe which either seek membership or could potentially apply if their present foreign policy changes, or the EU gives a signal that they might now be included on the enlargement agenda. However, these are not formally part of the current agenda, which is already delayed due to bilateral disputes in the Balkans and difficulty in fully implementing the acquis communautaire (the accepted body of EU law).

Today the accession process follows a series of formal steps, from a pre-accession agreement to the ratification of the final accession treaty. These steps are primarily presided over by the European Commission (Enlargement Commissioner and DG Enlargement), but the actual negotiations are technically conducted between the Union's Member States and the candidate country.

Before a country applies for membership it typically signs an association agreement to help prepare the country for candidacy and eventual membership. Most countries do not meet the criteria to even begin negotiations before they apply, so they need many years to prepare for the process. An association agreement helps prepare for this first step.

In the case of the Western Balkans, a special process, the Stabilisation and Association Process exists to deal with the special circumstances there.

When a country formally applies for membership, the Council asks the commission to prepare an opinion on the country's readiness to begin negotiations. The council can then either accept or reject the commission's opinion (the council has only once rejected the commission's opinion when the latter advised against opening negotiations with Greece).

If the council agrees to open negotiations the screening process then begins. The commission and candidate country examine its laws and those of the EU and determine what differences exist. The Council then recommends opening negotiations on "chapters" of law that it feels there is sufficient common ground to have constructive negotiations. Negotiations are typically a matter of the candidate country convincing the EU that its laws and administrative capacity are sufficient to execute European law, which can be implemented as seen fit by the member states. Often this will involve time-lines before the Acquis Communautaire (European regulations, directives and standards) has to be fully implemented.

Gallery of EU candidate state passports

See also 
 Future enlargement of the European Union
 Passports of the European Union
 Passports of the EFTA member states
 Schengen Area
 Common Travel Area
 Visa policy in the European Union
 United Kingdom visa requirements
 National identity cards in the European Economic Area
 European Economic Area
 European Free Trade Association
 United States visa
 Electronic System for Travel Authorization
 Visa policy of Canada
 List of passports

Notes

References

External links 

 European Passports in PRADO (The Council of the European Union Public Register of Authentic Travel and Identity Documents Online)

Passports by country
European Economic Area
Passports
Authentication methods